Juan Ramón "Mon" Martínez (born April 20, 1948 in  San Miguel, El Salvador) is a retired football player from El Salvador.

Club career
He played in Guatemala, where he won a title with Municipal in 1965–1966.

International career
Martínez represented his country at the 1968 Summer Olympics and at the 1970 FIFA World Cup in Mexico.

He scored 11 goals for the El Salvador national football team from 1967 to 1976, 7 of those in World Cup qualification.

References

1948 births
Living people
People from San Miguel, El Salvador
Association football midfielders
Salvadoran footballers
El Salvador international footballers
Olympic footballers of El Salvador
Footballers at the 1968 Summer Olympics
1970 FIFA World Cup players
C.S.D. Municipal players
C.D. Águila footballers
Once Municipal footballers
Salvadoran expatriate footballers
Expatriate footballers in Guatemala
Salvadoran expatriate sportspeople in Guatemala